Ilex pernyi is a species in the Ilex (holly) genus and the family Aquifoliaceae. This evergreen shrub or small tree occurs in Mongolia and the south-west of China, specifically in Anhui, Gansu, and Shaanxi. The leaves are diamond-shaped with sharply toothed margins, opposite on the many branches. The small flowers are yellow, and berries on the female plants are red.

References

pernyi
Flora of Anhui
Flora of Gansu
Flora of Shaanxi
Flora of Mongolia